Ilala or Ilala Ward (Kata ya Ilala in Swahili)   is an administrative ward and district capital of the Ilala District of the Dar es Salaam Region in Tanzania.The Kigogo ward of the Kinondoni District borders the ward to the north, and the Mchikichini and Gerezani wards to the east. The Temeke District wards of Keko, Chang'ombe, and Temeke border the ward to the south. Buguruni encircles the ward to the west.In 2016 the Tanzania National Bureau of Statistics report there were 38,923 people in the ward, from 31,083 in 2012.

Economy
The Ilala Ward is home to one of the country's largest markets, the Ilala Market or "Soko la Ilala". The Karume Memorial Stadium and the Sharif Shamba Public Park are also located in the ward. The ward also houses the National Arts Board, also known as "Baraza la Sanaa la Taifa" (BASATA). Health is one of the most important businesses in the ward, as Amana Referral Hospital estbalished in 1954 and Msimbazi Mission Hospital are located there.

Demographics
Like most of the district, the ward is the ancestral home of the Zaramo people. The ward has evolved into a cosmopolitian region as the city has grown over the years. In 2017, the ward had a total population of 38,923, with 18,954 men and 19,502 females.

Administration
The postal code for Ilala Ward is 12101. 
The ward is divided into the following neighborhoods: 
 Karume
 Kasulu
 Shariff Shamba

Government 
The ward, like every other ward in the country, has local government offices based on the population served.The Ilala Ward administration building houses a court as per the Ward Tribunal Act of 1988, including other vital departments for the administration the ward. The ward has the following administration offices:

 Iala Ward Police Station located in Karume neighborhood
 Ilala Ward Government Office (Afisa Mtendaji, Kata ya Ilala) in Shariff Shamba Neighborhood
 Iala Ward Tribunal (Baraza La Kata)  is a Department inside Ward Government Office

In the local government system of Tanzania, the ward is the smallest democratic unit. Each ward is composed of a committee of eight elected council members which include a chairperson, one salaried officer (with no voting rights), and an executive officer. One-third of seats are reserved for women councillors.

Education and health

Education
The ward is home to these educational institutions:
Msimbazi Mseto Primary School
Ilala Primary School
Ilala Islamic Primary School
Ilala Islamic Secondary School
Al-furqaan Primary School
Msimbazi Secoundary School
Kasulu Primary School, Ilala

Healthcare
The ward is home to the following health institutions: 
Amana Referral Hospital
Msimbazi Mission Hospital
Arafa Anne Dispensary

References

Ilala District
Wards of Dar es Salaam Region